A total solar eclipse occurred on March 7, 1598 (25 February 1598 by the Julian calendar). A solar eclipse occurs when the Moon passes between Earth and the Sun, thereby totally or partly obscuring the image of the Sun for a viewer on Earth. A total solar eclipse occurs when the Moon's apparent diameter is larger than the Sun's, blocking all direct sunlight, turning day into darkness. Totality occurs in a narrow path across Earth's surface, with the partial solar eclipse visible over a surrounding region thousands of kilometres wide.

Visibility
Totality was visible in the United Kingdom with a diagonal track from Cornwall in the south-west to Aberdeen in the north-east of Scotland.

It was observed from Germany by Tycho Brahe.

Related eclipses 
It is a part of solar Saros 133.

This is the 22nd member of Solar Saros 133. The previous event was on February 15, 1580 (21st member). The next event would be on March 17, 1616 (23rd member).

See also 
 List of solar eclipses visible from the United Kingdom

References

 Illuminating Eclipses: Astronomy and Chronology in King Lear Hanno Wember, Figure 2: Solar Eclipse, March 7, 1598 zone of totality cuts through central England.
 Total Solar Eclipse of 1598 Mar 07  Fred Espenak
 Total Eclipse of the Sun: 1598 March 07 
 NASA chart graphics
 Googlemap
 NASA Besselian elements
 

1598 3 7
1598 in science
1598 3 7